The following is a list of shows that were on CRUNCH on YTV.

Canadian
 Rollbots
 Sidekick
 Kid vs. Kat
 League of Super Evil
 Team Galaxy
 Viva Piñata
 Zimmer Twins

Nicktoons
 SpongeBob SquarePants
 The Fairly OddParents
 T.U.F.F. Puppy
 Planet Sheen
 Fanboy & Chum Chum
 The Penguins of Madagascar
 The X's

Marvel
 Wolverine and the X-Men
 The Super Hero Squad Show

Italian
 Monster Allergy

CRUNCH